Carnism is a concept used in discussions of humanity's relation to other animals, defined as a prevailing ideology in which people support the use and consumption of animal products, especially meat. Carnism is presented as a dominant belief system supported by a variety of defense mechanisms and mostly unchallenged assumptions. The term carnism was coined by social psychologist and author Melanie Joy in 2001 and popularized by her book Why We Love Dogs, Eat Pigs, and Wear Cows (2009).

Central to the ideology is the acceptance of meat-eating as "natural", "normal", "necessary", and (sometimes) "nice", known as the "Four Ns". An important feature of carnism is the classification of only particular species of animal as food, and the acceptance of practices toward those animals that would be rejected as unacceptable cruelty if applied to other species. This classification is culturally relative, so that, for example, dogs are eaten by some people in Korea but may be pets in the West, while cows are eaten in the West but protected in much of India.

History

Analyzing the history of vegetarianism and opposition to it from ancient Greece to the present day, literary scholar Renan Larue found certain commonalities in what he described as carnist arguments. According to him, carnists typically held that vegetarianism is a ludicrous idea unworthy of attention, that mankind is invested with dominion over animals by divine authority, and that abstaining from violence against animals would pose a threat to humans. He found that the views that farmed animals do not suffer, and that slaughter is preferable to death by disease or predation, gained currency in the nineteenth century, but that the former had precedent in the writings of Porphyry, a vegetarian who advocated the humane production of animal products which do not require animals to be slaughtered, such as wool.

In the 1970s, traditional views on the moral standing of animals were challenged by animal rights advocates, including psychologist Richard Ryder, who in 1971 introduced the notion of speciesism. This is defined as the assignment of value and rights to individuals solely on the basis of their species membership. In 2001, psychologist and animal rights advocate Melanie Joy coined the term carnism for a form of speciesism that she argues underpins using animals for food, and particularly killing them for meat. Joy compares carnism to patriarchy, arguing that both are dominant normative ideologies that go unrecognized because of their ubiquity:

Sandra Mahlke argues that carnism is the "central crux of speciesism" because the eating of meat motivates ideological justification for other forms of animal exploitation. Abolitionist Gary Francione argues against this that carnism is not a hidden ideology, but a conscious choice; in his view some animals are viewed as food and others family because humans regard non-humans as property, and they may value that property as they please.

Features

Edible or inedible

A central aspect of carnism is that animals are categorized as edible, inedible, pets, vermin, predators, or entertainment animals, according to people's schemata – mental classifications that determine, and are determined by, our beliefs and desires. There is cultural variability regarding which animals count as food. Dogs are eaten in China, and South Korea, but elsewhere are not viewed as food, either because they are loved or, as in the Middle East and parts of India, regarded as unclean. Cows are eaten in the West, but revered in much of India. Pigs are rejected by Muslims and Jews but widely regarded by other groups as edible. Joy and other psychologists argue that these taxonomies determine how the animals within them are treated, influence subjective perceptions of their sentience and intelligence, and reduce or increase empathy and moral concern for them.

Meat paradox

Jeff Mannes writes that carnism is rooted in a paradox between most people's values and actions: they oppose harming animals, and yet eat them. He argues that this conflict leads to cognitive dissonance, which people attempt to attenuate through psychic numbing. The apparent conflict between caring about animals and embracing diets which require them to be harmed has been termed the "meat paradox".

There is experimental evidence supporting the idea that the meat paradox induces cognitive dissonance in Westerners. Westerners are more willing to eat animals which they regard as having lesser mental capacities and moral standing, and conversely, to attribute lesser mental faculties and moral standing to animals which are eaten. Furthermore, the relationship is causative: the categorization of animals as food or not affects people's perception of their mental characteristics, and the act of eating meat itself causes people to attribute diminished mental capacity to animals. For example, in one study people rated an unfamiliar exotic animal as less intelligent if they were told native people hunted it, and in another they regarded cows as less intelligent after eating beef jerky.

Avoiding consideration of the provenance of animal products is another strategy. Joy argues that this is why meat is rarely served with the animal's head or other intact body parts.

Justification
Joy introduced the idea of the "Three Ns of Justification", writing that meat-eaters regard meat consumption as "normal, natural, and necessary". She argues that the "Three Ns" have been invoked to justify other ideologies, including slavery and denying women the right to vote, and are widely recognized as problematic only after the ideology they support has been dismantled.

The argument holds that people are conditioned to believe that humans evolved to eat meat, that it is expected of them, and that they need it to survive or be strong. These beliefs are said to be reinforced by various institutions, including religion, family and the media. Although scientists have shown that humans can get enough protein in their diets without eating meat, the belief that meat is required persists. Moreover, a 2022 study published in PNAS calls into question the impact of meat consumption on shaping the evolution of the human species.

Building on Joy's work, psychologists conducted a series of studies in the United States and Australia, published in 2015, that found the great majority of meat-eaters' stated justifications for consuming meat were based on the "Four Ns" – "natural, normal, necessary, and nice". The arguments were that humans are omnivores (natural), that most people eat meat (normal), that vegetarian diets are lacking in nutrients (necessary), and that meat tastes good (nice).

Meat-eaters who endorsed these arguments more strongly reported less guilt about their dietary habits. They tended to objectify animals, have less moral concern for them and attribute less consciousness to them. They were also more supportive of social inequality and hierarchical ideologies, and less proud of their consumer choices.

Helena Pedersen, in her review of Joy's original book, suggested Joy's theory was too broad and did not account for variation in people's beliefs and attitudes; for example, Pedersen argues that Joy's argument that people dissociate animal products from their animal origins cannot account for some hunters who make explicit connection between the two as a justification for consumption or for former vegetarians who have changed their attitudes towards the consumption of animal products. Pedersen also says that Joy seems to present the consumption of animal-products as arising from ignorance of how they are produced, however Pedersen disagrees that people would simply change their consumption if they were more informed.

"Saved from slaughter" narratives

An illustration of dissonance reduction is the prominence given to "saved from slaughter" stories, in which the media focus on one animal that evaded slaughter, while ignoring the millions that did not. Joy wrote that this dichotomy is characteristic of carnism.

Animals at the center of these narratives include Wilbur in Charlotte's Web (1952); the eponymous and fictional star of Babe (1995); Christopher Hogwood in Sy Montgomery's The Good, Good Pig (2006); the Tamworth Two; Emily the Cow and Cincinnati Freedom. The American National Thanksgiving Turkey Presentation is cited as another example. A 2012 study found that most media reporting on it celebrated the poultry industry while marginalizing the link between living animals and meat.

Non-academic reception
Opinion pieces in The Huffington Post, The Statesman, and The Drum praised the idea, saying the term made it easier to discuss, and challenge, the practices of animal exploitation.
An article in the beef industry outlet Drovers Cattle Network criticized the use of the term, saying it implied that eating animal foods was a "psychological sickness".

See also
 Food studies
 Moral psychology
Non-vegetarianism
 Psychology of eating meat
 Speciesism
 Taboo food and drink
 Veganism
 List of vegan media

Notes

References

Further reading
 Castricano, Jodey, and Rasmus R. Simonsen, eds. (2016). Critical Perspectives on Veganism. Basingstoke, United Kingdom: Palgrave Macmillan.
 Kanerva, Minna (2021). The New Meatways and Sustainability. Bielefeld, Germany: transcript Verlag.
 Herzog, Hal (2010). Some We Love, Some We Hate, Some We Eat. New York: Harper Collins.
 Joy, Melanie (2015). "Beyond carnism and toward rational, authentic food choices", TEDx talk.
 Monteiro, Christopher A., Tamara D. Pfeiler, Marcus D. Patterson and Michael A. Milburn (2017). "The Carnism Inventory: Measuring the ideology of eating animals". Appetite 113: 51–62. .
 Potts, Annie, ed. (2016). Meat Culture. Leiden, Netherlands: Brill.
 Vialles, Noëlie (1994). Animal to Edible. Cambridge: Cambridge University Press.

Animal rights
Animal welfare
Carnivory
Animal ethics
Ethical schools and movements
Philosophy of biology
Prejudices
Psychological concepts
Sustainable food system
Vegetarianism